Five vessels of the British Royal Navy have been named HMS Scylla, after the sea monster Scylla of Greek mythology.

  was an 18-gun brig-sloop launched  in 1809 and broken up 1846.
  was a wooden screw corvette launched in 1856 and sold for breakup in 1882.
  was an  second class cruiser in service from 1891 to 1914.
  was a  light cruiser launched in 1940, seriously damaged by a mine in 1944, and sold in 1950.

Royal Navy ship names